MPCA may refer to:

Madhya Pradesh Cricket Association, the governing body of cricket activities in the Indian state of Madhya Pradesh
Manpower Citizens' Association, a trade union in Guyana
Minnesota Pollution Control Agency, a Minnesota state agency
Motion Picture Corporation of America, an American film production company
Multilinear principal component analysis, a mathematical procedure